"I'm in Love" is a song written by Bobby Womack. It was first recorded by Wilson Pickett in 1967, which gave him a top-ten R&B hit on Billboard's chart in 1968, peaking at number 4 as well as peaking at number 45 on the Billboard Hot 100.

Background 
"I'm in Love" was written in response to some of the criticism he had been receiving after marrying the widow of the recently deceased Sam Cooke.

Cover versions
Womack himself recorded his version of the song in 1968 shortly after Pickett's version was released and included it on his 1969 album, Fly Me to the Moon.
The version to achieve the most success came in 1974, when Aretha Franklin released it as a single. Her version hit number 1 on Billboard's R&B chart for two weeks and also peaked at number 19 on the Billboard Hot 100. Wilson Pickett's version is most recently used as the back-track for Nature of the Beast's "When It's Good".
Tom Petty and the Heartbreakers covered the song in concert in the early 1980s, and a version is featured on their set The Live Anthology.
The Temptations covered the song in 2007 in the studio album Back to Front.

Personnel
Wilson Pickett version
Produced by Tommy Cogbill & Tom Dowd
Wilson Pickett  - vocals
Gene Chrisman - drums
Tommy Cogbill - electric bass
Bobby Emmons - organ  
Bobby Wood - piano 
Bobby Womack - lead guitar
Reggie Young - additional guitar
Charlie Chalmers - tenor saxophone 
King Curtis - tenor saxophone 
Gene "Bowlegs" Miller - trumpet
Floyd Newman - baritone saxophone

Bobby Womack version
Produced by Chips Moman
Bobby Womack - vocals, guitar, musical arrangement
Gene Chrisman - drums
Bobby Emmons - organ  
Mike Leech - bass, musical arrangement 
Bobby Wood - piano 
Reggie Young - guitar

Aretha Franklin version
Aretha Franklin - lead vocals
Judy Clay - background vocals
Gwen Guthrie - background vocals
Cissy Houston - background vocals
Deidre Tuck - background vocals
William Eaton - orchestral arrangement
Stan Clarke - bass 
Cornell Dupree - guitar
Donny Hathaway - acoustic piano
Bob James - additional keyboards
Ralph MacDonald - percussion
Rick Marotta - drums
Gene Orloff - concertmaster
David Spinozza - guitar

References

1974 singles
Wilson Pickett songs
Aretha Franklin songs
Songs written by Bobby Womack
Song recordings produced by Jerry Wexler
1960s songs
Atlantic Records singles
Year of song missing
1968 singles
Song recordings produced by Arif Mardin